Antônio José da Silva Gouveia (30 June 1957 – 30 December 2008), better known as just Zezé, was a Brazilian footballer. He played in two matches for the Brazil national football team in 1979. He was also part of Brazil's squad for the 1979 Copa América tournament.

References

External links
 

1957 births
2008 deaths
Brazilian footballers
Brazil international footballers
Place of birth missing
Association footballers not categorized by position